Amuwa Paschim  is a village development committee in Rupandehi District in Lumbini Province of southern Nepal. It is one of the richest VDC in rupandehi district. A new four lane highway has been under construction between belbas to bethari via amuwa. connecting to Lumbini this highway will be one of the rupandehi's and nepal's standard highway. At the time of the 1991 Nepal census it had a population of 6870 people living in 1127 individual households.

References

Populated places in Rupandehi District